Am Rong (1929 – May 1975) was a Cambodian soldier and filmmaker, who acted as a spokesman on military matters for the Khmer Republic during the Cambodian Civil War. Western journalists commented on the irony of his name as he gave briefings which "painted a rosy picture of the increasingly desperate situation on the ground" during the war.

Career

Rong was born in Battambang to a farming family, and was initially educated at the Royal School of Administration. He joined the Cambodian army in 1953 and served as a paratrooper from 1956.

Henry Kamm, characterised Rong as "affable and intelligent". He studied film in France at the IDHEC, the French state film school from 1962 to 1964. Given that Cambodia's then-ruler Prince Norodom Sihanouk had considered himself the premier filmmaker of the country and did not appreciate rivals, Rong found himself commissioned major, and the army "created a film unit consisting of one lonely major, who had little to do". He was later given the job of giving official war briefings to foreign journalists. By the end of the war, he had been promoted to general, and a subordinate had been made information minister.

Am Rong was killed by the Khmer Rouge at some point after the fall of Phnom Penh in April, 1975.

Films

Am Rong completed a number of short documentary films during his career. At least one, The Independence of Cambodia, is held by Rithy Panh's Bophana Audiovisual Center.

References

Sources
Elizabeth Becker When the War Was Over: Cambodia and the Khmer Rouge Revolution (Revised edition, 1998)

Cambodian propagandists
Cambodian anti-communists
1975 deaths
People executed by the Khmer Rouge
Executed Cambodian people
1929 births
Cambodian film directors